Kiru may refer to:

Kill!, a 1968 Japanese film directed by Kihachi Okamoto
Kiru, Iran
Kiru, Hormozgan (disambiguation), Iran
Kiru, Kenya
Kiru, Nigeria
Kiru (Tanzanian ward), Babati Rural District, Manyara Region, Tanzania